Joseph Nutt was Governor of the Bank of England from 1802 to 1804. He had been Deputy Governor from 1801 to 1802. He replaced Job Mathew Raikes as Governor and was succeeded by Benjamin Winthrop.

See also
Chief Cashier of the Bank of England

References

External links

Governors of the Bank of England
Year of birth missing
Year of death missing
British bankers
Deputy Governors of the Bank of England